This is a list of bridges, dams, and ferries on the Ottawa River, proceeding stream upwards from the Saint Lawrence River, with the year in which they were opened.

Crossings

Between the Saint Lawrence River and the Lake of Two Mountains

Across the Lake of Two Mountains

From the Lake of Two Mountains upstream

Entirely within Quebec

See also 

 List of bridges in Ottawa
 List of bridges to the Island of Montreal
 List of crossings of the Rivière des Prairies
 List of crossings of the Rivière des Mille Îles
 List of hydroelectric stations
 List of Ontario generating stations on the Ottawa River
 List of reservoirs and dams in Canada
 List of reservoirs and dams in Quebec

References

External links 

 Map

Crossings
Ottawa River